The Princes of Ottajano (or Ottaiano) are a cadet branch of the ducal dynasty of Tuscany. Along with the Veronese Medici Counts of Caprara, and Gavardo, they make up the last and closest descendants to the main line of the House of Medici.

History
The founder of the Ottajano line was Ottaviano de' Medici, who married Bartholomea Giugni and gave issue to Bernardetto and Countess Constance, della Gherardesca of Donoratico. Bernardetto married Giulia de' Medici, daughter of Alessandro de' Medici, Duke of Florence, descended from Cosimo il Vecchio and Lorenzo the Magnificent of the Medici family's senior line. It was Bernardetto who bought from Gonzaga in 1567 the fiefdom of Ottaviano, located near Naples. 

Over the centuries, this remaining House of Medici has reached a leading position in the aristocracy of the Kingdom of Two Sicilies.  Among the members of the dynasty are leaders of the Roman Catholic Church, ambassadors, cardinals (Francesco de Medici di Ottaiano), a pope, and Don Luigi de' Medici, representative of the Kingdom of Naples at the Congress of Vienna.

Tuscan succession claim 
In his book "The History of My Dynasty," Ottaviano de' Medici points to Vatican law at the time and claims that either the Medici Princes of Ottaiano or the Veronese Medici should have inherited the Grand Duchy of Tuscany upon the death of last of the Medici Grand Dukes, Gian Gastone de' Medici, instead of the Habsburg-Lorraine line, since both Medici branches were closer descendants than Francis Stephen of Lorraine (Francis I, Holy Roman Emperor), who was a great-great-great-grandson of Francesco I de' Medici via the female line. However, due to the Habsburg-Lorraine influence, they were able to secure Florence for themselves.

21st century 
The branch is still in existence under the current head, Giuliano de' Medici di Toscana di Ottajano, who holds the titles of 14th Prince of Ottajano and 12th Duke of Sarno.
The Princes of Ottaiano and the Veronese Counts have common ancestry with most royal monarchies, and the branches are the collateral branch of the House of Medici. In the modern day, the resulting House of Medici has still maintained close ties with the remains of the House of Bonaparte.

List of Princes of Ottajano 
 1606–93 Ottaviano de' Medici, 1st Prince of Ottajano
 1693–1717 Giuseppe de' Medici, 2nd Prince of Ottajano b. 1635
 1717-63 Giuseppe de' Medici, 3rd Prince of Ottajano
 1763-70 Michele de' Medici, 4th Prince of Ottajano
 1770-28 Aug 1793 Giuseppe de' Medici, 5th Prince of Ottajano
 28 Aug 1793-11 Aug 1832 Michele de' Medici, 6th Prince of Ottajano
 11 Aug 1832– 1 Jan 1874 Giuseppe de' Medici, 7th Prince of Ottajano
 1 Jan 1874–28 Feb 1883  Michele de' Medici di Ottajano, 8th Prince of Ottajano
 28 Feb 1883– 9 Apr 1894 Giuseppe de' Medici, 9th Prince of Ottajano
 9 Apr 1894–1912 Angelica de' Medici, 10th Princess of Ottajano
 1912 – 7 May 1925 Alberto Marino de' Medici, 11th Prince of Ottajano
 7 May 1925– 2 Dec 1983 Armando de' Medici, 12th Prince of Ottajano
 2 Dec 1983–2 Feb 2015 Giovanni Battista de' Medici di Ottajano, 13th Prince of Ottajano 
 2 Feb 2015 – current Giuliano de' Medici di Ottajano, 14th Prince of Ottajano

See also

 Republic of Florence
 Medici
 Albizzi
 Duchy of Florence
 Alberti
 Italian Renaissance
 Medici family tree
 Grand Duchy of Tuscany
 Pazzi

Footnotes

References
Famiglie de' Medici di Ottaiano e di Sarno
Genealogical Tree of the House De' Medici of Tuscany (Italian)
Ottaviano de' Medici di Toscana di Ottajano, Storia della mia dinastia, Polistampa 2001.
 Christopher Hibbert, The House of Medici: Its Rise and Fall (Morrow, 1975)
 George Williams, Papal Genealogy: The Families And Descendants Of The Popes (McFarland 2009)
 Prince Ottaviano de' Medici:Solving a 417-year-old murder mystery (May 4, 2004)
Walper, Simone (16 Avril 2009) "Profitez des riches. Nos 3 valeurs préférées." MoneyWeek. Numerous 029

House of Medici
Italian princes